Ilya Andreyevich Serikov (born 4 March 1995) is a Russian football player. He plays for FC Arsenal Tula.

Club career
He made his professional debut in the Russian Professional Football League for FC Spartak Kostroma on 8 August 2014 in a game against FC Zenit-2 St. Petersburg.

He made his Russian Football National League debut for FC Shinnik Yaroslavl on 29 March 2015 in a game against FC SKA-Energiya Khabarovsk.

References

External links
 

1995 births
Footballers from Yaroslavl
Living people
Russian footballers
Association football defenders
FC Shinnik Yaroslavl players
FC Spartak Kostroma players
FC Dynamo Saint Petersburg players
FC Chayka Peschanokopskoye players
FC Sokol Saratov players
FC Arsenal Tula players
Russian First League players
Russian Second League players